Marie Rønningen (born 13 March 1994) is a Norwegian competitive sailor, born in Bærum. 

She won a gold medal in 49er FX at the 2018 49er & 49er FX European Championships, along with Helene Næss. She qualified to represent Norway at the 2020 Summer Olympics in Tokyo 2021, competing in 49erFX.

References

External links
 
 
 

 

1994 births
Living people
Sportspeople from Bærum
Norwegian female sailors (sport)
Sailors at the 2020 Summer Olympics – 49er FX
Olympic sailors of Norway